The Great Artesian Basin (GAB), located in Australia, is the largest and deepest artesian basin in the world, stretching over , with measured water temperatures ranging from . The basin provides the only source of fresh water through much of inland Australia.

The Basin underlies 22% of the continent, including the states and territories of Queensland (most of), the Northern Territory (the south-east corner of), South Australia (the north-east part of), and New South Wales (northern part of). The Great Artesian Basin Coordinating Committee (GABCC) coordinates activity between the various levels of government and community organisations.

Physiography
This area is one of the distinct physiographic provinces of the larger East Australian Basins division, and includes the smaller Wilcannia Threshold physiographic section.

Geology
The water of the Great Artesian Basin is held in a sandstone layer laid down by continental erosion of higher ground during the Triassic, Jurassic, and early Cretaceous periods. During a time when much of what is now inland Australia was below sea level, the sandstone was covered by a layer of marine sedimentary rock, which formed a confining layer that trapped water in the sandstone aquifer. The eastern edge of the basin was uplifted when the Great Dividing Range formed. The other side was created from the landforms of the Central Eastern Lowlands and the Great Western Plateau to the west.

Most recharge water enters the rock formations from relatively high ground near the eastern edge of the basin (in Queensland and New South Wales) and very gradually flows toward the south and west. A much smaller amount enters along the western margin in arid central Australia, flowing to the south and east through the permeable sandstone, at a rate of one to five metres per year.

Discharge water eventually exits through a number of springs and seeps, mostly in the southern part of the basin. The age of the groundwater, determined by carbon-14 and chlorine-36 measurements combined with hydraulic modelling, ranges from several thousand years for the recharge areas in the north to nearly 2 million years in the south-western discharge zones.

Water source
Prior to the arrival of Europeans, waters of the Great Artesian Basin (GAB) discharged through mound springs, many in arid South Australia, such as Witjira-Dalhousie Springs. These springs sustained a variety of endemic invertebrates, such as molluscs, and supported extensive Aboriginal communities and trade routes. After the arrival of Europeans, the springs facilitated exploration, and allowed the provision of faster communications between south-eastern Australia and Europe, via the Australian Overland Telegraph Line. The Great Artesian Basin became an important water supply for cattle stations, irrigation, and livestock and domestic purposes, and is a vital life line for rural Australia. To tap it, boreholes are drilled down to a suitable rock layer, and the pressure of the water often forces it up without the need for pumps.

The discovery and use of the water in the Great Artesian Basin allowed the settlement of thousands of square kilometres of country away from rivers in inland New South Wales, Queensland, and South Australia, that would otherwise have been unavailable for pastoral activities. European discovery of the basin dates from 1878 when a shallow bore near Bourke produced flowing water.  There were similar discoveries in 1886 at Back Creek east of Barcaldine, and in 1887 near Cunnamulla.

In essence, water extraction from the GAB is a mining operation, with recharge much less than current extraction rates. This included just under 2000 freely-flowing bores and more than 9000 that required mechanical power to bring water to the surface. Many bores are unregulated or abandoned, resulting in considerable water wastage. These problems have existed for many decades, and in January 2007 the Australian Commonwealth Government announced additional funding in an attempt to bring them under control. However, many of the mound springs referred to above have dried up due to a drop in water pressure, probably resulting in extinction of several invertebrate species.

The underground copper and uranium mine commenced operations in 1988 and is expected to continue operating until approximately 2060.

In addition, the Basin provides water, via a  bore, for a geothermal power station at Birdsville. After being cooled, the water is also the source of the town's drinking water.

Whole of Basin management
As the Great Artesian Basin underlies parts of Queensland, New South Wales, South Australia and the Northern Territory, which each operate under different legislative frameworks, policies and resource management approaches, a coordinated "whole-of-Basin" approach to the management of this important natural resource is required. The Great Artesian Basin Coordinating Committee (GABCC) provides advice from community organisations and agencies to State, Territory and Australian Government Ministers on efficient, effective and sustainable whole-of-Basin resource management and to coordinate activity between stakeholders.

Membership of the Committee comprises all State, Territory, and Australian Government agencies with responsibilities for management of parts of the Great Artesian Basin, community representatives nominated by agencies; and sector representatives.

Environmental concerns 
There is a strong debate surrounding coal seam gas (CSG) drilling and hydraulic fracturing.

In 2011, ABC TV's public affairs program Four Corners revealed that significant concerns were being expressed about depletion and chemical damage to the Basin as a result of coal seam gas extraction. In one incident, reported in the program, the Queensland Gas Company (QGC) "fracked" its Myrtle 3 well connecting the Springbok aquifer to the coal seam below (the Walloon Coal Measures) in 2009. A local farmer was concerned that the process might have released  of a potentially toxic chemical into the Basin. QGC admitted the incident, but "did not alert authorities or nearby water users about the problem until thirteen months after the incident". The safety data sheet QGC had submitted for the hydraulic fracturing chemical was derived from the United States, incomplete and ten years out of date.

Over thirty chemicals may be used in the process of hydraulic fracturing and their long-term impact on aquifers, agriculture and people supported by them has been quantifiable and verified for quite some time. Lead, aluminium, arsenic, barium, boron, nickel and uranium have all been found beyond recommended levels in the groundwater contaminated by CSG. Instances of groundwater being contaminated and by extension poisoning the ecosystems sustained by the availability of groundwater have been widely documented, and are an exacerbating factor in regards to the population's capability to cope with drought through usage of groundwater sources in Australia.

See also

Geology of Australia
Guarani Aquifer

References

External links
Ancient water source vital for Australia , ScienceDaily
Great Artesian Basin Coordinating Committee website  - information and resources relating to the Great Artesian Basin
Water Down Under - The Great Artesian Basin Story, Video production by Anvil Media on behalf of the Great Artesian Basin Coordinating Committee (GABCC), 2008, Australian Government Department of Sustainability, Environment, Water, Population and Communities
Liquid Gold: the Great Artesian Basin in Queensland Digital Story 2014, State Library of Queensland

Drainage basins of Australia
Aquifers in Australia
Endorheic basins of Australia
Landforms of New South Wales
Landforms of the Northern Territory
Landforms of Queensland
Landforms of South Australia
Basins
Regions of Australia
Regions of the Northern Territory
Regions of New South Wales
Regions of Queensland
Regions of South Australia
Lake Eyre basin
Physiographic provinces